Rhodosalinus is a Gram-negative, rod-shaped, moderately halophilic, facultatively anaerobic and motile genus of bacteria from the family of Rhodobacteraceae with one known species (Rhodosalinus sediminis). Rhodosalinus sediminis has been isolated from a marine saltern from Wendeng in China.

References

Rhodobacteraceae
Bacteria genera
Monotypic bacteria genera